Douglas Howard Sills (born July 5, 1960) is an American actor.

Early life
Sills was born in Detroit, Michigan, the son of Rhoda (Nemeth) and Archie Sills, and grew up in the suburb of Franklin, in a Jewish household. He was friends (and did amateur theatrics and films) with both Sam Raimi and Bruce Campbell. Sills attended Cranbrook School, from which he graduated in 1978, and the University of Michigan where he majored in music. He then continued his education at the American Conservatory Theater in California.

Career
During the 1990s, Sills built a solid reputation as a stage character actor, especially in the professional theaters of southern California. He also performed in several national tours, including Into the Woods and The Secret Garden, which would also feature future Broadway stars as James Stacy Barbour and Audra McDonald. He met his partner, Todd, in 1994 while touring with The Secret Garden. His first Broadway role, however, came when composer Frank Wildhorn and lyricist Nan Knighton approached him in hopes of finding a male lead for their new musical, The Scarlet Pimpernel. Before this audition, Sills told his agent not to send him to any more auditions because he planned to attend law school.  With a score in the 99th percentile on the Law School Admission Test (LSAT), Sills hoped to attend Stanford Law School. However, being a fan of the movie as a child, Sills decided to give acting one more chance and was offered the lead as Sir Percy Blakeney.

Douglas Sills opened in his first Broadway show on November 9, 1997. Continuing the role in three other versions of the show, Sills received a Tony Award nomination. He portrayed the foppish hero in SP 1.0 (The Original Broadway Production, starring Terrence Mann, Christine Andreas & Gilles Chiason), SP 2.0 (Revised Broadway Production, starring Rachel York & Rex Smith), and for several months in the National Tour (4.0). Although rumored as the title role of Wildhorn's Dracula, the Musical, Sills opted out (despite doing a recording demo), and Tom Hewitt portrayed the gothic character at the premiere at the La Jolla Playhouse in 2001. He played Orin Scrivello and several other roles in the 2003 Broadway revival cast of Little Shop of Horrors.

In 2004, Sills joined the Broadway-bound Chicago production of Monty Python's Spamalot. However, before the production began, Sills left on his own account due to reported "major script changes." In early 2005, production plans were announced for Wildhorn's new musical Cyrano de Bergerac, from the same team that helped launch his career with The Scarlet Pimpernel. The title role was written specifically for Sills, however, producers dropped plans for the show in spring 2006 without explanation. A studio-concept recording was planned, starring Sills, Linda Eder and Rob Evan, but plans also quickly fell through.

In 2009, Sills starred opposite Kristin Chenoweth at the Encores! New York City Center production of Music in the Air, a long-forgotten Kern-Hamerstein musical from the 1930s. The concert-style version ran February 5 through February 8.  Sills assumed the role of Gomez Addams in the national tour of The Addams Family in September 2011 until the company's closing on December 30, 2012.

From March 27 to April 12, 2013, Sills took on the role of Jack in Long Wharf Theatre's production of William Mastrosimone's Ride the Tiger.

Sills played Walter Burns in La Jolla Playhouse's production of His Girl Friday from May 28 to June 30, 2013.

Sills appeared on Broadway beginning in April 2015, playing an aging orchestra conductor in the comedy Living on Love, written by Joe DiPietro, starring Renee Fleming, Jerry O'Connell and Anna Chlumsky.

He appeared in the new musical Dave at the Arena Stage in Washington, D.C. in 2018, in the role of Chief of Staff Bob Alexander. The musical has music by Tom Kitt, lyrics by Nell Benjamin, and the book by Benjamin and Thomas Meehan and is based on the 1993 film Dave.

Beginning in 2022, Sills played Monsieur Baudin in HBO's The Gilded Age.

Notable theatre roles

References

External links

1960 births
American male musical theatre actors
Male actors from Detroit
Cranbrook Educational Community alumni
Living people
University of Michigan School of Music, Theatre & Dance alumni
People from Franklin, Michigan
Theatre World Award winners
American Conservatory Theater alumni